Gadfa is a hamlet in the community of Llaneilian, Ynys Môn, Wales, which is 140 miles (225.3 km) from Cardiff and 218.8 miles (352.1 km) from London.

The dispersed settlement has a scatter of buildings mainly along and to the west of the A5025, with a smaller number on the eastern side of the road.

See also 
 List of localities in Wales by population

References 

Villages in Anglesey